The Ruger American Rifle is a family of budget-level hunting/sporting bolt-action centerfire rifle made by Sturm, Ruger & Co., which also produces a line of rimfire rifles with similar designs called the Ruger American Rimfire.

Design 
The Ruger American has a receiver made from 4140 chrome-moly bar stock and a hammer-forged barrel with a blued black oxide finish, mounted onto a polymer composite stock. Some models are also available in a stainless steel variant. Rather than using a traditional recoil lug, the rifle's barreled action is secured in the stock by a bedding system known as "Power Bedding®", which uses two V-shaped steel action blocks that wedge the receiver firmly in place to prevent lateral shifts and also serve as recoil lugs.  Because the front and back action screws are fastened through the centers of the action blocks, the blocks also functionally act as pillar beddings and allows the barrel to be free-floated.

The rifle feeds cartridges into the chamber from a proprietary detachable rotary magazine via a push feed mechanism employing dual cocking cams on the stainless steel bolt, which has three locking lugs allowing for a smaller 70° throw angle of the bolt handle. The rifle comes with a tang-mounted safety.

Models 
STANAG magazines are found on the Predator versions with model numbers 26922 (6.5 mm Grendel) and 26944 (.223 Rem). AICS style magazines are found on the Predator versions with model numbers # 26948 (6 mm Creedmoor), # 26971 (.204 Ruger), 26972 (.243 Win), # 26973 (6.5 mm Creedmoor), # 26974 (.308 Win) and # 36902 (.350 Legend).
In early 2018, Ruger introduced variant models for the 5.56 NATO/.223 Rem (# 26965) and .300 Blackout (# 26968) that accept STANAG magazines.
 Hunter: a heavy barrel version bedded into the Magpul "Hunter American" stock using AICS-pattern PMAG® 7.62 AC box magazines, with a  threaded alloy steel barrel factory-equipped with a muzzle brake, chambered for 6.5mm Creedmoor and .308 Win.

See also 
 BMS Cam rifle
 Mossberg MVP
 Remington Model 7615

References

External links
Ruger American Rifle product page

Bolt-action rifles of the United States
American Rifle
Rotary magazine firearms
.300 BLK firearms
7.62 mm rifles
5.56 mm firearms